Melungeons are an ethnicity from the Southeastern United States who descend from Europeans, Native American, and sub-Saharan Africans brought to America as indentured servants and later as slaves. Historically, the Melungeons were associated with settlements in the Cumberland Gap area of central Appalachia, which includes portions of East Tennessee, Southwest Virginia, and eastern Kentucky.
Tri-racial describes populations who claim to be of mixed European, African and Native American ancestry. Although there is no consensus on how many such groups exist, estimates range as high as 200,000.

Definition 
The ancestry and identity of Melungeons has been a highly controversial subject. Secondary sources disagree as to their ethnic, linguistic, cultural, and geographic origins and identity. They might accurately be described as a loose collection of families of diverse ethnic origins that migrated to frontier areas; settled near one another; and intermarried, mostly in Hancock and Hawkins Counties in Tennessee; nearby areas of Kentucky; and Lee County, Virginia. Their ancestors can usually be traced back to colonial Virginia and the Carolinas. They were largely endogamous through the 19th century and married primarily within their community until about 1900.

Melungeons have been defined and documented as having multiracial ancestry. They did not exhibit characteristics that could be classified as those of a single racial phenotype. Most modern-day descendants of Appalachian families that are traditionally regarded as Melungeon are generally European American in appearance and often (though not always) have dark hair and eyes and a swarthy or olive complexion. Descriptions of Melungeons have varied widely over time. In the 19th and the early 20th centuries, they were sometimes identified as "Portuguese," Native American, or light-skinned African American. In the 19th century, free people of color sometimes identified as Portuguese or Native American to avoid being classified as black in the segregated slave societies.

Other Melungeon individuals and families are accepted and identify as white, particularly since the mid-20th century. They have tended to "marry white" since the 19th century.

Scholars and commentators do not agree on who should be included under the term "Melungeon." Contemporary authors identify differing lists of surnames to be included as families associated with Melungeons. The English surname Gibson and Irish surname Collins appear frequently, and the genealogist Pat Elder calls them "core" surnames. Vardy Collins and Shep Gibson had settled in Hancock County, and they and other Melungeons are documented by land deeds, slave sales, and marriage licenses.

The original meaning of the word "Melungeon" is obscure. From about the mid-19th to the late-20th centuries, it referred exclusively to one tri-racial isolate group: the descendants of the multiracial Collins, Gibson, and several other related families at Newman's Ridge, Vardy Valley, and other settlements in and around Hancock and Hawkins Counties, Tennessee.

Origins 

According to the principle of partus sequitur ventrem, which Virginia incorporated into law in 1662, children born in the colonies were assigned the social status of their mother regardless of their father's ethnicity or citizenship. That meant the children of enslaved African or African-American women were born into slavery, but it also meant the children of free white or mulatto women, even if they were fathered by enslaved African men, were born free. The free descendants of such unions formed the majority of the ancestors of the free families of color listed in the 1790 and 1810 censuses. Early colonial Virginia was very much a "melting pot" of peoples, and before slavery hardened as a racial caste, white and black working-class people had often lived and worked in close quarters and formed relationships and marriages.

Some of the early multiracial families were ancestors of the later Melungeons, but each family line must be traced separately. Over the generations, most individuals of the group called Melungeon were persons of mixed European and African descent, sometimes also with Native American ancestry, whose ancestors had been free in colonial Virginia.

Edward Price's dissertation on Mixed-Blood Populations of the Eastern United States as to Origins, Localizations, and Persistence (1950) stated that children of European and free black unions had also intermarried with persons of alleged Native American ancestry. In 1894, the US Department of the Interior, in its "Report of Indians Taxed and Not Taxed," noted that the Melungeons in Hawkins County "claim to be Cherokee of mixed blood." The term "Melungeon" has since sometimes been applied as a catch-all phrase for a number of groups of individuals with mixed-race ancestry.

In 1995, Paul Heinegg published Free African American Families in Virginia, North Carolina, South Carolina, Maryland and Delaware, and he has since published regular updates. He found through his research and documented that the great majority of free people of color in the 1790 and 1810 censuses had ancestors from colonial Virginia, who were the children of unions between free white women and free, indentured, or enslaved African or African-American men.

Similarly, in 2012, the genealogist Roberta Estes and her fellow researchers of the Melungeon DNA Project reported that the Melungeon lines had likely originated in the unions of black and white indentured servants living in Virginia in the mid-1600s before slavery became widespread in the United States. They concluded that as laws to prevent the mixing of races were put into place, those family groups intermarried with one another. Creating an endogamous group, they migrated together, sometimes along with white neighbors, from western Virginia through the Piedmont frontier of North Carolina, before they settled primarily in the mountains of East Tennessee. In addition, the Melungeon DNA Project has documented multiracial ancestry, primarily European and African, for numerous people identified as Melungeon, which affirms the evidence from written documentation.

Evidence 
Free people of color are documented as migrating with European-American neighbors in the first half of the 18th century to the frontiers of Virginia and North Carolina, where they received land grants like their neighbors. For instance, the Collins, Gibson, and Ridley (Riddle) families owned land adjacent to one another in Orange County, North Carolina, where they and the Bunch family were listed in 1755 as "free Molatas (mulattoes)" subject to taxation on tithes. By settling in frontier areas, free people of color found more amenable living conditions and could escape some of the racial strictures of Virginia and North Carolina Tidewater plantation areas.

The historian Jack D. Forbes has discussed laws in South Carolina related to racial classification:
In 1719, South Carolina decided who should be an "Indian" for tax purposes since American [Indian] slaves were taxed at a lesser rate than African slaves. The act stated: "And for preventing all doubts and scruples that may arise what ought to be rated on mustees, mulattoes, etc. all such slaves as are not entirely Indian shall be accounted as negro. 
Forbes said that at the time, "mustees" and "mulattoes" were terms for persons of partly Native American ancestry. He wrote,
My judgment (to be discussed later) is that a mustee was primarily part-African and American [Indian] and that a mulatto was usually part-European and American [Indian]. The act is also significant because it asserts that part-American [Indians] with or without [emphasis added] African ancestry could be counted as Negroes, thus having an implication for all later slave censuses.This view does not have a consensus.

In about 1767, some of the ancestors of the Melungeons began to reach the frontier New River area, where they are listed in the 1780s on tax lists of Montgomery County, Virginia. From there they migrated south in the Appalachian Range to Wilkes County, North Carolina, where some are listed as "white" on the 1790 census. They resided in a part that became Ashe County, where they are designated as "other free" in 1800.

The Collins and Gibson families (identified as Melungeon ancestors) were recorded in 1813 as members of the Stony Creek Primitive Baptist Church in Scott County, Virginia. They appear to have been treated as social equals of the white members. The earliest documented use of the term "Melungeon" is found in the minutes of that church (see Etymology below). While there are historical references to the documents, the evidence has come from transcribed copies.

From the Virginia and North Carolina frontiers, the families migrated west into frontier Tennessee and Kentucky. The earliest known Melungeon in what is now northeast Tennessee was Millington Collins, who executed a deed in Hawkins County in 1802. However, there is some evidence that Vardy Collins and Shep Gibson had settled in Hawkins (what is now Hancock County) by 1790. Several Collins and Gibson households were listed in Floyd County, Kentucky in the 1820 census, where they were classified as "free persons of color." In the 1830 censuses of Hawkins and neighboring Grainger County, Tennessee, the Collins and Gibson families are listed as "free-colored." Melungeons were residents of the part of Hawkins that in 1844 was organized as Hancock County.

By 1830, the Melungeon community in Hawkins County numbered 330 people in 55 families. In adjoining Grainger County, there were 130 people in 24 families. According to Edward Price, "Because of them, Hawkins County had more free colored persons in the 1830 census than any other county in Tennessee except Davidson (which includes Nashville) and more free colored families named Collins than any other county in the United States." Melungeon families have also been traced in Ashe County, in northwestern North Carolina.

Contemporary accounts documented that Melungeon ancestors were considered by appearance to be mixed race. During the 18th and the early 19th centuries, census enumerators classified them as "mulatto," "other free," or as "free persons of color." Sometimes, they were listed as "white" or sometimes as "black" or "negro" but almost never as "Indian". One family described as "Indian" was the Ridley (Riddle) family, as was noted on a 1767 Pittsylvania County, Virginia, tax list. It had been designated as "mulattoes" in an earlier record of 1755. Estes et al., in their 2012 summary of the Melungeon Core DNA Testing Program, stated that the Riddle family is the only Melungeon participant with historical records identifying them as having Native American origins, but their DNA is European. Among the participants, only the Sizemore family is documented as having Native American DNA.

The court record of Jacob Perkins vs. John White (1858) in Johnson County, Tennessee, provides definitions of the time related to race and free people of color. As in Virginia, if a free person was mostly white (up to one-eighth black), he was considered legally white and a citizen of the state:

"Persons that are known and recognized by the Constitution and laws of Tennessee, as free persons of color are those who by the act of 1794 section 32 are taken and deemed to be capable in law to be certified in any case what is in, except against each other or in the language of the statute "all Negroes, Indians, Mulattoes, and all persons of mixed blood descended from Negro or Indian ancestors to the third generation inclusive though one ancestor of each generation may have been a white person, white bond or free."... That if the great grandfather of Plaintiff was an Indian or Negro and he is descended on the mother's side from a white woman, without any further Negro or Indian blood than such as he derived on the father's side, then the Plaintiff is not of mix blood, or within the third generation inclusive; in other words that if the Plaintiff has not in his veins more than 1/8 of Negro or Indian blood, he is a citizen of this state and it would be slanderous to call him a Negro."

During the 19th century, their intermarriages with white spouses caused Melungeon-surnamed families to be increasingly classified as white on census records. In 1935, a Nevada newspaper anecdotally described Melungeons as "mulattoes" with "straight hair."

Assimilation 
Ariela Gross has shown by analysis of court cases, the shift from perceptions of an individual as "mulatto" to "white" was often dependent upon appearance and, especially, community perception of a person's activities in life: who one associated with and whether the person fulfilled the common obligations of citizens. Census takers were generally people of a community and so they classified people racially as they were known by the community. Definitions of racial categories were often imprecise and ambiguous, especially for "mulatto" and "free person of color." In the Thirteen Colonies and the United States at times during the 17th, 18th, and 19th centuries, "mulatto" could mean a mixture of African and European, African and Native American, European and Native American, or all three. At the same time, those groups intermarried.

Persons were often identified by the company they kept and which ethnic culture they identified with. There were differences between how people identified themselves and how others identified them. Because of slavery, colonial and state laws were biased toward identifying multiracial people of partial African origin as African or "black" although persons of mixed African and Native American descent often identified and lived culturally as Native Americans, particularly if their maternal line was Native American. Many Native American tribes were organized into matrilineal kinship systems in which children were considered born into the mother's clan and took their social status from her people. Inheritance and descent was figured through the maternal lines.

Because of the loose terminology and social attitudes to mixed-race persons, the remaining non-reservation American Indians in the Upper South were generally not recorded separately as Indians. They were often gradually reclassified as mulatto or free people of color, especially as generations intermarried with neighbors of African descent. In the early decades of the 20th century, Virginia and some other states passed laws imposing the one-drop rule, requiring all persons to be classified as either white or black. Those of any known African ancestry were to be classified as black, regardless of their appearance and how they self-identified or were known in the community.

After Virginia passed its Racial Integrity Act of 1924, officials went so far as to alter existing birth and marriage records to reclassify as "colored" some mixed-race individuals or families who identified as and had been recorded as "Indian." Those actions destroyed the documented continuity of identity of several Indian communities. The historical documentation of continuity of self-identified Native American families was lost. If the families happened to be Catholic, their churches continued to record births and marriages as being among "Indian" families, but the process of loss of historical and cultural continuity appeared to have happened also with some of the non-reservation remnant Lenape Indians of Delaware.

According to the Tennessee Encyclopedia of History and Culture, in his 1950 dissertation, the cultural geographer Edward Price proposed that Melungeons were families descended from free people of color, who were of European and African ancestry, and mixed-race unions between persons of African ancestry and Native Americans in colonial Virginia, whose territory included the modern-day states of Kentucky and West Virginia.

Acceptance 
The families known as "Melungeons" in the 19th century were generally well integrated into the communities in which they lived, but they may still have been affected by racism. Records show that on the whole, they enjoyed the same rights as whites. For example, they held property, voted, and served in the army. Some, such as the Gibsons, owned slaves as early as the 18th century.

Under the first Tennessee constitution of 1796, male free people of color were allowed to vote. After fears had been raised by the 1831 Nat Turner slave rebellion, Virginia, Tennessee, and other southern states passed new restrictions on free people of color. By its new constitution of 1834, Tennessee disfranchised free people of color, reduced them to second-class status, and excluded them from the political system.

In that period, several Melungeon men were tried in Hawkins County in 1846 for "illegal voting" under suspicion of being black or free men of color and thereby ineligible for voting. They were acquitted, presumably by demonstrating to the court's satisfaction that they had no appreciable black ancestry. Standards were not then as strict as under the 20th-century "one-drop rule" laws. As in some other cases, racial status was chiefly determined by people testifying as to how the men were perceived by the community and whether they had "acted white" by voting, serving in the militia, or undertaking other common citizens' obligations available to white men:

After the American Civil War and the Reconstruction Era, southern whites struggled to regain political power and to re-assert white supremacy over freedmen and traditionally-free families such as the Melungeons. The white Democrat-dominated state legislatures passed Jim Crow laws. However, issues of race were often brought to court as a result of arguments about money.

For example, in 1872, a widowed woman's Melungeon ancestry was assessed in a trial in Hamilton County, Tennessee. The case was brought by relatives of her late husband, who challenged her inheritance of money from him after his death. They questioned the legitimacy of a marriage between a white man and a woman known to be Melungeon and argued that the marriage was not legitimate because the woman was of black ancestry. Based on the testimony of people in the community, the court decided the woman in the case was not of African ancestry or had no such ancestors recently enough to matter.

During the period of segregation, a North Carolina statute barred "Portuguese" people, presumably Melungeons, as North Carolina does not have a large Portuguese American community, from whites-only schools. However, under that statute the "Portuguese" were not classified as black and were not required to attend black schools.

Modern anthropological and sociological studies of Melungeon descendants in Appalachia have demonstrated that they have become culturally indistinguishable from their "non-Melungeon" white neighbors by sharing a Baptist religious affiliation and other community features. With changing attitudes and a desire for more work opportunities, numerous descendants of the early Melungeon pioneer families have migrated from Appalachia to make their lives in other parts of the United States.

Legends 
In spite of being culturally and linguistically similar to their European neighbors, the multi-racial families were of a sufficiently different physical appearance to provoke speculation as to their identity and origins. In the first half of the 19th century, the pejorative term "Melungeon" began to be applied to these families by local white European-American neighbors. Local "knowledge" or myths soon began to arise about them. According to the historian Pat Elder, the earliest of those was that they were "Indian" (more specifically, "Cherokee"). Jack Goins, an identified Melungeon descendant and researcher, states that the Melungeons claimed to be both Indian and Portuguese. An example was "Spanish Peggy" Gibson, the wife of Vardy Collins.

A few ancestors may have been of mixed Iberian (Spanish and/or Portuguese) and African origin. The historian Ira Berlin has noted that some early slaves and free blacks of the charter generation in the colonies were "Atlantic Creoles", mixed-race descendants of Iberian workers and African women from slave ports in Africa. Their male descendants grew up bilingual and accompanied Europeans as workers or slaves. The majority of Melungeon early ancestors, who had migrated from Virginia over time, are of northern European and African ancestry given the history of settlement in late-17th- and early-18th-century eastern Virginia. Later generations in Tennessee intermarried with descendants of Scotch-Irish immigrants who arrived in the mid-to-late 18th century and settled in the backcountry before the American Revolution.

Given historical evidence of Native American settlement patterns, Cherokee Nation descent is highly unlikely for the original Melungeon ancestral families. Those families were formed during the colonial era in the Virginia Tidewater areas, which were not Cherokee territory. Some of their descendants may have later intermarried with isolated individuals of Cherokee or other Native American ancestry in East Tennessee. Melungeons in Graysville, Tennessee claimed Cherokee ancestors.

The anthropologist E. Raymond Evans wrote in 1979 regarding those claims:
In Graysville, the Melungeons strongly deny their Black heritage and explain their genetic differences by claiming to have had Cherokee grandmothers. Many of the local whites also claim Cherokee ancestry and appear to accept the Melungeon claim ...

In 1999, the historian C. S. Everett hypothesized that John Collins (recorded as a Sapony Indian who was expelled from Orange County, Virginia about January 1743), might be the same man as the Melungeon ancestor John Collins, who was classified as a "mulatto" in 1755 North Carolina records. However, Everett revised that theory after he has discovered evidence that these were two different men named John Collins. Only descendants of the latter man, who was identified as mulatto in the 1755 record in North Carolina, has any proven connection to the Melungeon families of eastern Tennessee.

Other peoples frequently suggested as Melungeon ancestors are the Black Dutch and the Powhatan Indian group. The Powhatan were an Algonquian-speaking tribe who inhabited eastern Virginia during the initial period of European colonization.

Speculation about Melungeon origins continued during the 19th and the 20th centuries. Writers recounted folk tales of shipwrecked sailors, lost colonists, hoards of silver, and ancient peoples such as the Carthaginians, or Phoenicians. With each writer, new elements were added to the mythology surrounding the group, and more surnames were added to the list of possible Melungeon ancestors. The journalist Will Allen Dromgoole wrote several articles on the Melungeons in the 1890s.

In the late 20th century, amateur researchers suggested that the Melungeons' ethnic identity may include ancestors who were Turks and Sephardi (Iberian) Jews. The writers David Beers Quinn and Ivor Noel Hume theorize that the Melungeons were descended from Sephardi Jews who fled the Inquisition and came as sailors to North America. They also say that Francis Drake did not repatriate all of the Turks he saved from the sack of Cartagena, but some came to the colonies. However, Janet Crain notes that there is no written documentation to support that theory.

The paper on the Melungeon DNA Project, published by Paul Heinegg, Jack Goins, and Roberta Estes in the Journal of Genetic Genealogy, shows that ancestry of the sample is primarily European and African, with only one person having a Native American paternal haplotype. There is no genetic evidence to support the Turkish or Jewish ancestry theories.

Etymology 
There are many hypotheses about the etymology of the term Melungeon. Linguists and many researchers believe that it may have been derived from the French mélange, meaning mixture, or perhaps [nous] mélangeons meaning "[we] mix/mingle". That etymology is also found in several dictionaries. There were numerous French Huguenot immigrants in Virginia from 1700, and the French language could have contributed a term.

Joanne Pezzullo and Karlton Douglas speculate that a more likely derivation of Melungeon, related to the dominance of the English language in the colonies, may have been from the now obsolete English word malengin (also spelled mal engin) meaning "guile", "deceit", or "ill intent." It was used by Edmund Spenser as the name of a trickster figure in his epic poem, The Faerie Queene (1590–1596), which was popular in Elizabethan England. The phrase "harbored them Melungins" could be equivalent to "harbored someone of ill will" or mean "harbored evil people" without reference to any ethnicity.

A different explanation traces the word to malungu (or malungo), a Luso-African word from Angola, meaning "shipmate" and derived from the Kimbundu word ma'luno, meaning "companion" or "friend." The word, spelled as Melungo and Mulungo, has been found in numerous Portuguese records. It is said to be a derogatory word that was used by Africans for people of Portuguese or other white ancestry. If so, the word was likely brought to America through people of African ancestry.

Kennedy (1994) speculates that the word derives from the Turkish melun can (from Arabic mal`un jinn ملعون جنّ), which purportedly means "damned soul." He suggests that at the time, that was a term used by Turks for Muslims who had been captured and enslaved aboard Spanish galleons.

Some writers try to connect the term Melungeon to an ethnic origin of people designated by that term, but there is no basis for that assumption. It appears the name arose as an exonym, which a neighboring people of whatever origin called the multiracial people.

On October 7, 1840, the polemical Brownlow's Whig, of Jonesborough, Tennessee, published an article entitled "Negro Speaking!" The publisher referred to a rival Democratic politician with a party in Sullivan County as "an impudent Malungeon from Washington City a scoundrel who is half Negro and half Indian," then as a "free negroe". In that and related articles, he does not identify the Democrat by name.

Modern identity 
The term Melungeon was historically considered an insult, a label applied to Appalachians who were by appearance or reputation of mixed-race ancestry. In southwest Virginia, the term Ramp was similarly applied to people of mixed race. That term has never shed its pejorative character.

In December 1943, Virginia State Registrar of Vital Statistics, Walter Ashby Plecker, sent county officials a letter warning against "colored" families trying to pass as "white" or "Indian" in violation of the Racial Integrity Act of 1924. He identified specific surnames by county, including "Lee, Smyth and Wise: Collins, Gibson, (Gipson), Moore, Goins, Ramsey, Delph, Bunch, Freeman, Mise, Barlow, Bolden (Bolin), Mullins, Hawkins (chiefly Tennessee Melungeons)". (Lee County, Virginia borders Hancock County, Tennessee.) He directed the offices to reclassify members of certain families as black, which caused the loss for numerous families of documentation in records that showed their continued identification as Native American.

Different researchers have developed their own lists of the surnames of core Melungeon families. Generally, specific lines within families have to be traced to document such identity. For example, DeMarce (1992) listed Hale as a Melungeon surname.

By the mid-to-late 19th century, the term Melungeon appeared to have been used most frequently to refer to the biracial families of Hancock County and neighboring areas. Several other uses of the term in the print media, from the mid-19th to the early 20th centuries, have been collected at the Melungeon Heritage Association Website. The spelling of the term varied widely, as was common for words and names at the time. Eventually, the form "Melungeon" became standard.

Since the late 1960s, "Melungeon" has been increasingly adopted by individuals who identify with the ethnic group. The shift in meaning may have resulted from the popularity of Walk Toward the Sunset, a drama written by the playwright Kermit Hunter and produced outdoors. The play was first presented in 1969 in Sneedville, the county seat of Hancock County. Making no claim to historical accuracy, Hunter portrayed the Melungeons as indigenous people of uncertain race who were mistakenly perceived as black by neighboring white settlers. As the drama portrayed Melungeons in a positive, romantic light, many individuals began for the first time to self-identify by that term. Hunter intended for his drama "to improve the socio-economic climate" of Hancock County, and to "lift the Melungeon name 'from shame to the hall of fame'." The play helped revive interest in the history of Melungeons. The civil rights movement and the social changes of the 1960s further contributed to wider acceptance of members of the group. Research in social history and genealogy has documented new facts about people identified as Melungeons.

Since the mid-1990s, popular interest in the Melungeons has grown tremendously although many descendants have left the region of historical concentration. The writer Bill Bryson devoted the better part of a chapter to them in his The Lost Continent (1989).

N. Brent Kennedy, a non-specialist, wrote a book on his claimed Melungeon roots, The Melungeons: The Resurrection of a Proud People (1994). Kennedy's work was controversial. He identified Abraham Lincoln and Elvis Presley as Melungeons. He also believed that there were pre-Columbian Welsh and Phoenicians/Carthaginians in North America but dismissed them as related as he thought that Melungeons do not look Welsh and the time span from any Phoenicians in North America to today, which he calculated at 2500 years, would probably not allowed any of their physical appearance to survive. With the advent of the internet, many people are researching family history and the number of people self-identifying as having Melungeon ancestry has increased rapidly, according to Kennedy. Some individuals have begun to self-identify as Melungeons after they had read about the group on a website and discovered their surname on the expanding list of "Melungeon-associated" surnames. Others believe that they have certain "characteristic" physical traits or conditions or assume that a multiracial heritage means they are Melungeon.

For example, some Melungeons are allegedly identifiable by shovel-shaped incisors, a dental feature more commonly found among Native Americans and Northeast Asians, but not restricted to these peoples. After an unsubstantiated hypothesis, popularized by N. Brent Kennedy, that Melungeons are of Turkish origin, some people have identified as having an enlarged external occipital protuberance, dubbed an "Anatolian bump".

Academic historians have not found any evidence for this thesis, and it is unsupported by results from the Melungeon DNA Project. As noted before, the analysis shows that Melungeon descendants overwhelmingly have Northern European and African DNA ancestry.

Internet sites promote the anecdotal claim that Melungeons are more prone to certain diseases, such as sarcoidosis or familial Mediterranean fever. Academic medical centers have noted that neither of those diseases is confined to a single population.

Kennedy's claims of ancestral connections to that group have been strongly disputed. The professional genealogist and historian Virginia E. DeMarce reviewed his 1994 book and found that Kennedy's documentation of his Melungeon ancestry was seriously flawed. He had a very indistinct definition of Melungeons although the group had been extensively studied and documented by other researchers. She criticized Kennedy for trying to include people who might have had other than Northern European ancestry and said that he did not properly take account of existing historical records or recognized genealogical practice in his research. He claimed to have ancestors who were persecuted for racial reasons. However, she found that his named ancestors were all classified as white in records; held various political offices, which showed that they could vote and were supported by their community; and were landowners. Kennedy responded to her critique in an article of his own.<ref>[http://underonesky.org/SEKMIE_PDF/SEKMIE3A.pdf "Dr. Brent Kennedy Responds to Virginia DeMarce", Southeastern Kentucky Melungeon Information Exchange]</ref>

The Ridgetop Shawnee Tribe of Indians in Kentucky, which is neither federally recognized or state recognized as an Indian tribe, claims that most families in its area who are commonly identified as Melungeon are of partial Native American descent. The organization says their ancestors migrated to the region in the late 18th and the early-to-mid-19th centuries. Most of these families claimed the Ridgetop Shawnee heritage to explain their dark skin and Indian features and to avoid racial persecution. In 2010, the Kentucky General Assembly passed resolutions that acknowledged the civic contributions of the Ridgetop Shawnee Tribe of Indians to the state.

 Similar groups 
The following are other multi-racial groups that at one time were classified as tri-racial isolates. Some identify as Native American and have received state recognition, as have six tribes in Virginia.

Delaware
 Nanticoke-Moors (and in Maryland) Nanticoke groups in Delaware and New Jersey (where they are intermarried with Lenape) have received state recognition. Most had left the area in the late eighteenth and nineteenth centuries.
Florida
 Dominickers of Holmes County in the Florida Panhandle
Indiana
 Ben-Ishmael Tribe, pejoratively called "Grasshopper Gypsies"
Louisiana
 Redbones (and in Texas)
Maryland
 Piscataway Indian Nation, formerly also known as We-Sorts, one of three Piscataway-related groups recognized as Native American tribes by the state
New Jersey and New York
 Ramapough Mountain Indians (aka "Jackson Whites") of the Ramapo Mountains, recognized by both New Jersey and New York as Native Americans 
North Carolina
 Coree or "Faircloth" Indians of Carteret County
 Haliwa-Saponi, recognized by the state as Native American
 Lumbee, recognized by the state as Native American
 Person County Indians, aka "Cubans and Portuguese"
Ohio
 Carmel Indians of Highland County
South Carolina
 Red Bones (NB: distinct from the Gulf States Redbones)
 Turks
 Brass Ankles
Virginia
 Monacan Indians (a.k.a. "Issues") of Amherst and Rockbridge counties, recognized by state of Virginia and the federal government (2018) as a Native American tribe, along with five other Virginia tribes
West Virginia
 Chestnut Ridge people of Barbour County (also known as Mayles or, pejoratively, "Guineas")

Each of these groupings of multiracial populations has a particular history. There is evidence for connections between some of them, going back to common ancestry in colonial Virginia. For example, the Goins surname group in eastern Tennessee has long been identified as Melungeon. The surname Goins is also found among the Lumbee of southern North Carolina, a multi-racial group that has been recognized by the state as a Native American tribe. In most cases, the multi-racial families have to be traced through specific branches and lines, as not all descendants were considered to be Melungeon or other groups.

 See also 
 Melungeon DNA Project
 List of topics related to the African diaspora
 Vardy Community School
 Mulatto
 Pardo

 References 

 Further reading 

 Ball, Bonnie (1992). The Melungeons: Notes on the Origin of a Race' '. Johnson City, Tennessee: Overmountain Press.
 Berry, Brewton (1963). Almost White: A Study of Certain Racial Hybrids in the Eastern United States. New York: Macmillan Press.
 Bible, Jean Patterson (1975). Melungeons Yesterday and Today. Signal Mountain, Tennessee: Mountain Press.
 Brake, Katherine Vande. How They Shine: How They Shine: Melungeon Characters in Fiction of Appalachia. Macon, GA: Mercer University Press.
 Brake, Katherine Vande. Through the Back Door: Melungeon Literacies and Twenty-First Century Technologies. Macon, GA: Mercer University Press.
 Cavender, Anthony P. "The Melungeons of Upper East Tennessee: Persisting Social Identity," Tennessee Anthropologist 6 (1981): 27-36
 DeMarce, Virginia E. (1993). "Looking at Legends – Lumbee and Melungeon: Applied Genealogy and the Origins of Tri-Racial Isolate Settlements." National Genealogical Society Quarterly 81 (March 1993): 24–45, scanned online, Historical-Melungeons
 Forbes, Jack D. (1993). Africans and Native Americans: The Language of Race and the Evolution of Red-Black Peoples. University of Illinois Press.
 Goins, Jack H. (2000). Melungeons: And Other Pioneer Families, Blountville, Tennessee: Continuity Press.
 Hashaw, Tim. Children of Perdition: Melungeons and the Struggle of Mixed America. Macon, GA: Mercer University Press.
 Heinegg, Paul (2005). FREE AFRICAN AMERICANS OF VIRGINIA, NORTH CAROLINA, SOUTH CAROLINA, MARYLAND AND DELAWARE Including the family histories of more than 80% of those counted as "all other free persons" in the 1790 and 1800 census, Baltimore, Maryland: Genealogical Publishing, 1999–2005. Available in its entirety online.
 Hirschman, Elizabeth. Melungeons: The Last Lost Tribe in America. Macon, GA: Mercer University Press.
 Johnson, Mattie Ruth (1997). My Melungeon Heritage: A Story of Life on Newman's Ridge. Johnson City, Tennessee: Overmountain Press.
 Kennedy, N. Brent (1997) The Melungeons: the resurrection of a proud people. Mercer University Press.
 Kessler, John S. and Donald Ball. North From the Mountains: A Folk History of the Carmel Melungeon Settlement, Highland County, Ohio. Macon, GA: Mercer University Press.
 Langdon, Barbara Tracy (1998). The Melungeons: An Annotated Bibliography: References in both Fiction and Nonfiction, Hemphill, Texas: Dogwood Press.
 McGowan, Kathleen (2003). "Where do we really come from?", DISCOVER 24 (5, May 2003)
 Offutt, Chris. (1999) "Melungeons", in Out of the Woods, Simon & Schuster.
 Overbay, DruAnna Williams. Windows on the Past: The Cultural Heritage of Vardy, Hancock County, Tennessee. Macon, GA: Mercer University Press.
 Podber, Jacob. The Electronic Front Porch: An Oral History of the Arrival of Modern Media in Rural Appalachia and the Melungeon Community. Macon, GA: Mercer University Press.
 Price, Henry R. (1966). "Melungeons: The Vanishing Colony of Newman's Ridge." Conference paper. American Studies Association of Kentucky and Tennessee. March 25–26, 1966.
 Reed, John Shelton (1997). "Mixing in the Mountains", Southern Cultures 3 (Winter 1997): 25–36.
 Scolnick, Joseph M Jr. and N. Brent Kennedy. (2004). From Anatolia to Appalachia: A Turkish American Dialogue. Macon, GA: Mercer University Press.
 Vande Brake, Katherine (2001). How They Shine: Melungeon Characters in the Fiction of Appalachia, Macon, Georgia: Mercer University Press.
 Williamson, Joel (1980). New People: Miscegenation and Mulattoes in the United States, New York: Free Press.
 Winkler, Wayne. 2019. Beyond the sunset: The Melungeon drama, 1969-1976. Macon, GA: Mercer University Press. 
 Winkler, Wayne (2004). "Walking Toward the Sunset: The Melungeons of Appalachia", Macon, Georgia: Mercer University Press.
 Winkler, Wayne (1997). "The Melungeons", All Things Considered. National Public Radio. 21 September 1997.

External links 
 Paul Brodwin, ""Bioethics in action" and human population genetics researMacon, GA: Mercer University Press.ch", Culture, Medicine and Psychiatry, Volume 29, Number 2 (2005), 145-178, DOI: 10.1007/s11013-005-7423-2 PDF, addresses issue of 2002 Melungeon DNA study by Kevin Jones, which is unpublished
 Melungeon Heritage Association, Official Website
 "The Graysville Melungeons", Tennessee Anthropologist, November 1979, hosted at Rootsweb
 Paul Heinegg, Free African Americans of Virginia, North Carolina, South Carolina, Maryland and Delaware, 1999–2005
 "Melungeons", Digital Library of Appalachia. Contains numerous photographs and documents related to Melungeons, mostly from 1900 to 1950.
 A Mystery People – The Melungeons From Louis Gates Jr's "Finding your Roots."
 "kindness our heroine shows Melungeon outcast Pearl (Erika Coleman)" from AC-T review of Big-Stone-Gap film. Accessed 6/8/2016

Multiracial ethnic groups in the United States
Pre-emancipation African-American history
Society of Appalachia
Ethnic groups in Appalachia
History of North Carolina
History of Tennessee
History of Virginia
Scotch-Irish American history
Multiracial affairs in the United States